= Thermostabilization =

Thermostabilization may refer to:

- In the food industry - preservation by heat, usually under pressure. The heat destroys all microorganisms and alters the catalytic activity of the enzymes.
- In molecular biology - the resistance to heat of a molecule (enzyme).
